John A. Horhn (born February 8, 1955) is an American politician who has served in the Mississippi State Senate from the 26th district since 1993. He is a Democrat. He served as state tourism director from 1989 to 1992.

He received a B.A. degree from Centre College in Kentucky.

References

1955 births
Living people
Democratic Party Mississippi state senators
Politicians from Jackson, Mississippi
African-American state legislators in Mississippi
20th-century American politicians
21st-century American politicians
20th-century African-American politicians
21st-century African-American politicians